Library cats are domesticated cats that live in public libraries worldwide. The association of cats with libraries continued from the Middle Ages up to the present day.

Contemporary library cats have also been featured in film and literature.

History 
The relationship between cats and libraries is centuries old. Monastic records from the Middle Ages indicate cats were kept in medieval monasteries in order to control rats that might otherwise eat valuable manuscripts.

Modern examples 
In 1745, Russian Empress Elisabeth published an order to transport cats to her court. The descendants of these cats now live in the State Hermitage museum. During the nineteenth century, the British government compensated those libraries that housed cats, on the understanding that they kept rodents away from books.

Library cats have appeared as characters in books and movies, are immortalized in stone in front of their institutions, and some are given positions on the institution's board. Many cats enjoy high-profile professional roles of marketing and public relations.

The relationship between libraries and cats is at times contentious. In one case, there were attempts to remove a cat from a library, based upon concerns of patrons with allergies claiming violations of the Americans with Disabilities Act. Another considered removal was because of the library cat's reaction to service animals. When a library cat was removed from its institution in Putnam Valley, New York, the institution suffered financially. Two members of the community were so upset about the removal that they deleted bequests to the library from their wills, producing an $80,000 loss in potential revenue.

The Library Cat Society, a now defunct organization, was established in 1987 to encourage the establishment, respect, and recognition of library cats. The society included dozens of member libraries that exchanged information about their cats, and published a newsletter about them.

The anthology Cats, Librarians, and Libraries: Essays for and About the Library Cat Society explored this relationship. The lives of library cats were studied by Gary Roma, a documentarian who produced a film entitled Puss in Books: Adventures of the Library Cat. According to Roma's website, there are more than 800 cataloged library cats worldwide. The catalog indicates that many of them have since died.

Additionally, cats are often found in independent bookstores throughout the United States.

Benefits 
Library cats have been used to befriend patrons, boost librarian morale, and inspire reading and literacy programs. Cats can also be useful for marketing campaigns, and are frequently used to generate publicity for their libraries, particularly on social media. The presence of a cat can create a relaxed environment and ease daily stress for patrons and librarians alike, but usually without the typically disruptive loud noises other animals (e.g., dogs) may produce. Cats' generally independent nature may also suit the intellectual environment of a library, as they are low-maintenance and may more readily suit the otherwise preoccupied intellectual personalities who frequent libraries.

Famous example 
Dewey Readmore Books is perhaps the most famous library cat. He lived in Iowa's Spencer Public Library for 19 years. After his death, a book was published about him, and later a number of follow-up books.

White Settlement City Council voted to removed library cat Browser from White Settlement Public Library in 2016, but reversed their decision after an international backlash.

See also

Animal-assisted therapy
Anthrozoology
Bodega cat
Ship's cat

References

Further reading
 Pacini, Daniela (Summer 2009). "Breaking Down Barriers: Dogs and Cats in Public Libraries". Faculty of Information Quarterly (University of Toronto) 1 (3). ISSN 1925-9107.
 Stevens, Norman D. (2004). "Myeo: the First Library Cat" (satirical). Molesworth Institute. (University of Connecticut). Paper 48.

External links 

 Purr 'n' Fur  Featuring Felines: Library Cats
 Gary Roma – Puss in Books: Adventures of the Library Cat
 Library Cats – American Library Association on Pinterest

Cats in popular culture
Library science
Cat mascots
Working cats
Mammal pest control